Knuthenlund is a manor house on the island of Lolland in southeastern Denmark. The estate has an area of 960 hectares. It is known for its award-winning goat and sheep milk cheeses. Knuthenlund also produces a range of other food products which are sold through Irma stores as well as to Michelin-starred restaurants in Denmark and abroad.

History
Knuthenlund was established in 1729 by Count Adam Christopher Knuth who had already inherited Knuthenborg from his father in 1714. The new estate was created by merging the land that had previously belonged to the five tenant farms in the village of Brekorpes as well as Ugleholt Forest and various other properties in the area.

In 1738, Knuthenlund was merged into Knuthenborg. It happened at the initiative of Knuth's widow, Ida Margrethe Reventlow, who had obtained royal permission to rearrange the Knuth family's holdings on behalf of their sons. As a farm under Knuthenborgt, Knuthenlund was then managed by a tenant, usually for a ten-year period at a time. From the 1870s, Knuthenlund focused on dairy products as a result of growing demand from the English and American markets. The buildings were replaced from 1877 to 1886.

In 1913, Knuthenlund and nearby Bøllesminde were sold to dairy owner Jens Peter Herman Hansen, who later that same year sold off Bøllesminde.

Today
The current owner, Susanne Hovmand-Simonsen, fourth generation at Knuthenlund, took over Knuthenlund after her father in 2006 and also owns the adjacent estate Ørbygård. She has turned the estate into one of Denmark's largest organic farm. The estate has an area of 960 hectares.

Food products
Knuthenlund is especially known for its goat and sheep milk cheeses. Its dairy opened in 2009 and has received multiple awards at the World Cheese Awards, Nordic Cheese Competition and Premio Roma. It received an honorary diploma from the Danish Gastronomic Academy in 2009 and became a member of the Guilde de Fromager in 2011. The dairy also produces milk and yogurt.

Knuthenlund also keeps traditional Danish breeds such as Danish Red cattle and Black and White Danish Landrace pigs. The estate produces organic meat from free-ranging animals (beef, lamb and pork), saussures and charcuterie.

A new flour mill opened on the estate in 2016. It produces flour from spelt and Öland wheat.

A range of food products are as of 2016 sold through Irma stores. Customers also include Michelin-starred restaurants in Denmark, Belgium and the Netherlands.

List of owners
 1729-1736: Adam Christopher Knuth
 1736-1776: Eggert Christopher Knuth
 1776-1802: Johan Henrich Knuth
 1802-1818: Frederik Knuth
 1818-1856: Frederik Marcus Knuth
 1856-1876: Eggert Christopher Knuth
 1876-1888: Adam Wilhelm Knuth
 1888-1913: Eggert Christopher Knuth
 1913-1938: Jens Peter Herman Hansen
 1938-1977: Morten Evald Hovmand-Hansen
 1977-2006: Sten Hovmand-Hansen
 2006-    : Susanne Hovmand-Simonsen

See also
 Frederiksdal

References

External links

Buildings and structures in Lolland Municipality
Manor houses in Lolland Municipality
Dairy products companies of Denmark
Buildings and structures associated with the Knuth family